Kim Myong-hwa (born April 25, 1967) is a North Korean sport shooter. She competed at the 2000 Summer Olympics in the women's skeet event, in which she tied for 9th place.

References

1967 births
Living people
Skeet shooters
North Korean female sport shooters
Shooters at the 2000 Summer Olympics
Olympic shooters of North Korea
Asian Games medalists in shooting
Asian Games gold medalists for North Korea
Asian Games silver medalists for North Korea
Shooters at the 1990 Asian Games
Shooters at the 2006 Asian Games
Medalists at the 1990 Asian Games
Medalists at the 2006 Asian Games
21st-century North Korean women